The men's decathlon competition at the 2005 Summer Universiade took place on 18 August and 19 August 2005 in the İzmir Atatürk Stadyumu in İzmir, Turkey.

Medalists

Records

Results

See also
2005 World Championships in Athletics – Men's decathlon
2005 Hypo-Meeting
2005 Décastar
2005 Decathlon Year Ranking

References
 decathlon2000
 fisu.net

Decathlon
2005